Satinder Singh (born 7 February 1987) is an Indian 400-meter hurdler. He hails from Jalandhar, Punjab, India. He won the gold medal in the 52nd National Inter-state Senior Athletic Championships, 2012 with a personal best timing of 49.99 seconds. He won a bronze medal in 20th Asian Athletic Championship, 2013.

References

Living people
1987 births
Indian male hurdlers
Athletes from Punjab, India
Sportspeople from Jalandhar